The 2009–10 Liga Națională was the 52nd season of Romanian Handball League, the top-level men's professional handball league. The league comprises 13 teams. CSM Medgidia withdrew from the championship and all of its results were cancelled. HCM Constanța were the defending champions, for the second time in a row.

Standings 

Liga Națională (men's handball)
2009 in Romanian sport
2010 in Romanian sport
2009–10 domestic handball leagues